Gina Marie Pacheco (born February 28, 1990) is a former Canadian soccer player who played as a midfielder.

Early life
Born in Sarnia, her father was born in the Azores islands in Portugal and her mother was born in Greater Sudbury, Ontario. She began playing youth soccer at the age of 3 with the Sarnia Spirit. She played with 10 year olds when she was 7, and spent a year with the U13 boys team, being named MVP. In 2006, she moved to Ottawa, joining the Ottawa Fury Academy. She served as team captain, named team MVP, and was named to the Super Y League all star teams in 2006 and 2007.

In 2008, she began attending the University of South Florida, playing for the women's soccer team. She scored her first goal in 2008 against the Illinois State Redbirds.

Club career
She played club soccer for the Ottawa Fury.

International career
In 2009, she was called up to the Canada national team for a pair of friendlies against the United States. She made her debut and sole appearance for the senior squad on July 19 against the US, coming on as a substitute for Kara Lang.

She was named to the Canada U20 for the 2010 CONCACAF Women's U-20 Championship.

In 2009, she was a nominee for Canadian U20 women's player of the year.

References

1990 births
Living people
Canada women's international soccer players
Canadian people of Azorean descent
Canadian people of Portuguese descent
Canadian women's soccer players
Soccer people from Ontario
Sportspeople from Sarnia
USL W-League (1995–2015) players
Women's association football midfielders
Ottawa Fury (women) players